Rebelión de los Juniors (2017) (Spanish for "The Junior Rebellion") was an annual professional wrestling major event produced by Mexican professional wrestling promotion International Wrestling Revolution Group (IWRG), that took place on March 19, 2017 in Arena Naucalpan, Naucalpan, State of Mexico, Mexico. The focal point of the show was the Eponymous Rebelión de los Juniors tournament, a ten-man elimination match where all wrestlers were either second or third-generation wrestlers. The last surviving participant was rewarded by becoming the number one contender for the IWRG Junior de Juniors Championship held by Herodes Jr. at the time of the show.

Previously the IWRG Rebelión de los Juniors tournaments had been eight-man elimination matches, but for the 2017 tournament IWRG had 10 participants; Argos, Bobby Lee Jr., Danny Casas, Diablo Jr., El Hijo del Alebrije, El Hijo de Pirata Morgan, The Killer Jr., Máscara Año 2000 Jr. Pirata Morgan Jr. and Silver King Jr. In the end Danny Casas defeated Máscara Año 2000 Jr. in the finals of the tournament. In addition to the ten tournament matches, the show featured five additional matches not related to the Rebelión de los Juniors tournament.

Production

Background
Professional wrestling has been a generational tradition in lucha libre since its inception early in the 20th century, with many second- or third-generation wrestlers following in the footsteps of their fathers or mothers. Several lucha libre promotions honor those traditions, often with annual tournaments such as Consejo Mundial de Lucha Libre's La Copa Junior. The Naucalpan, State of Mexico-based International Wrestling Revolution Group (IWRG) in 2011 created the IWRG Junior de Juniors Championship, a championship where only second- or third-generation wrestlers are allowed to wrestle for it. In addition to real-life second- or third-generation wrestlers there are a number of wrestlers who are presented as second- or third-generation wrestlers, normally masked wrestlers promoted as "Juniors". These wrestlers normally pay a royalty or fee for the use of the name, using the name of an established star to get attention from fans and promoters. Examples of such instances of fictional family relationships include Cien Caras Jr. who paid Cien Caras for the rights to use the name. In March 2011, only weeks after the creation of the Junior de Juniors Championship IWRG held their first IWRG Rebelión de los Juniors show, with the focal point being the Junior de Juniors Championship and "Junior" competitors. The Rebelión de los Juniors shows, as well as the majority of the IWRG shows in general, are held in "Arena Naucalpan", owned by the promoters of IWRG and their main arena. The 2017 show was the seventh year in a row that IWRG used the Rebelión de los Juniors name for a show.

Storylines
The Rebelión de los Juniors event featured fifteen professional wrestling matches with different wrestlers involved in pre-existing scripted feuds, plots and storylines. Wrestlers were portrayed as either heels (referred to as rudos in Mexico, those that portray the "bad guys") or faces (técnicos in Mexico, the "good guy" characters) as they followed a series of tension-building events, which culminated in a wrestling match or series of matches.

Family relationship

Results

Footnotes

References

External links
IWRG official website

2017 in professional wrestling
2017 in Mexico
IWRG Rebelión de los Juniors
March 2017 events in Mexico